Camp Lake is a small alpine lake in Deschutes County in the U.S. state of Oregon. The Camp Lake Trail skirts the lake along its north shore.

The lake forms the headwaters of the south fork of Whychus Creek, a tributary of the Deschutes River.

See also 
 List of lakes in Oregon

References

Lakes of Oregon
Lakes of Deschutes County, Oregon